Orompoto (also spelled Oronpoto) was an Alaafin (Emperor) of the Yoruba Oyo Empire. The empire of which she ruled is located in what is modern day western and north-central Nigeria.

History
Orompoto was the sister of her predecessor, Eguguojo. She became the first woman to become "king" of the Oyo in the imperial era, and the first woman since the pre-imperial ruler Yeyeori. Orompoto assumed the throne because there was no male successor within her family at the time. She helped drive the Nupe from Oyo in 1555. Orompoto lived in the 16th century.

Orompto was the second Oyo monarch to reign in the new capital of Igboho. Some traditions of the oral record hold that she was miraculously transformed into a man before assuming the throne there.

Orompoto used horses extensively in military battles and may have obtained them from Borgu. She was reportedly masterfully skilled on horseback, and created a specialized order of cavalry officers within her army that were subject to the Eso Ikoyi. The first of its kind, the cavalry was a force to be reckoned with in the various wars with Oyo's enemies. Considered a skillful warrior herself, she is said to have distinguished herself at the Battle of Illayi. While fighting her enemies there, she lost three war chiefs in quick succession, titleholders that are known as Gbonkas in Oyo. The third of them is believed to have fallen with his face locked in an unnerving grin. The enemies thought that he was still alive and was making a mocking gesture, and were overwhelmed by what they considered to be their inability to best the Oyo gbonkas. They abandoned the battlefield thereafter, and the Oyo later claimed victory.

She was succeeded by Ajiboyede.

References
 

Alaafins of Oyo
Women in 16th-century warfare
16th-century Nigerian women
History of women in Nigeria
African women in war
16th-century monarchs in Africa
16th-century women rulers
Yoruba queens regnant
Empresses regnant